The 30th Sports Emmy Awards were presented on April 27, 2009 in the Frederick P. Rose Hall at Lincoln Center in New York City. The nominees were announced on April 2.

Awards

Programs

Personalities

Technical

References

 030
Sports Emmy Awards
Sports Emmy Awards
Sports Emmy